Isoceteth-20 is a polyethylene glycol ether formed by the ethoxylation of iso-cetyl alcohol; with the general formula HO(C2H4O)nC16H33 where n has an average value of 20. It is a nonionic surfactant used as an emulsifier in some personal care products. However, as iso-cetyl alcohol is rare in nature isoceteth-20 does not see widespread use.

See also
Cetomacrogol 1000 - a similar material made from cetyl alcohol

References

Cosmetics chemicals
Ethers
Non-ionic surfactants